Love Locs is the fifth studio album by American rapper Khia and was released digitally on July 4, 2014, on her own label Thug Misses Entertainment.

Track listing 
All songs written by Khia

Release history

References 

2014 albums
Khia albums
Self-released albums
Contemporary R&B albums by American artists